Susana Somolinos (born 22 August 1977) is a Spanish judoka.

Achievements

References

1977 births
Living people
Spanish female judoka
Mediterranean Games bronze medalists for Spain
Mediterranean Games medalists in judo
Competitors at the 2001 Mediterranean Games
21st-century Spanish women